Scobey is an unincorporated community located in Yalobusha County, Mississippi, United States, approximately  southeast of Tillatoba and  north of Grenada.

Although an unincorporated community, Scobey has a post office and a zip code of 38953.

References

Unincorporated communities in Yalobusha County, Mississippi
Unincorporated communities in Mississippi
Mississippi placenames of Native American origin